Tan Khoon Yong (born 1954) is a fengshui grand master from Singapore. He established Way Chinese Geomancy Centre, now Way Fengshui Group, in 1984. He has conducted numerous seminars, including an annual "Chinese Zodiac & Fengshui Seminar".

Career
Grand Master Tan learnt fengshui from his father and grandfather. He established Way Chinese Geomancy Centre in 1984. The firm, now called Way Fengshui, offers consultancy services, retails speciality fengshui artefacts, and publishes books and educational materials on fengshui. On the retail side, they sell items which have been blessed by Tan for between SGD $18 to $88,000. Way Fengshui Lifestyle, the retail arm of Way Fengshui Group, typically sells 20–30 items a day, but during the period leading up to Chinese New Year they can sell up to 100 items per day. The best-selling item is a set of coloured cubes which can help enhance a person's fortune.

In 1993, he was appointed the Academic Adviser to the Department of Philosophy at Peking University.

He received the Public Service Medal (PBM) in 1999 from then-Singapore President S.R. Nathan.

Since 2004, Tan has represented Singapore in the International Feng Shui Convention (IFSC).

In 2008, he received the title of "Feng Shui Grand Master" from the International Feng Shui Association (IFSA) and is the first feng shui practitioner in Singapore to be awarded this title.

He holds the offices of Vice-President of the International Fengshui Association, Vice-Chairman of the Organization for Promoting Global Civilization, and Honorary Council Chairman of the Singapore Association of Writers.

In July 2016, Grand Master Tan's son, Mark, CEO of Way Fengshui Group, received  the 2016 Teochew Entrepreneur Award (Promising Award) on behalf of Way Fengshui Group.

In October 2016, Way Fengshui Group was awarded the Singapore Prestige Brand Award (Heritage Category).

Media exposure
Grand Master Tan has been invited by local (Singapore) and international media to share his views on issues related to fengshui, destiny studies, Chinese culture and traditions. He has been a speaker for the International Feng Shui Convention since 2004. In 2011, he gave a presentation entitled 'Unveil the Secrets of Yin Feng Shui'.

In July 2011, he was invited by the French TV show, Echappées Belles, to elaborate on the fengshui of iconic buildings, structures, and areas (Merlion, Singapore River, CBD area, Marina Bay Sands and Mount Faber) in Singapore. This show is aired on the French National Channel, France 5.

Family and personal life
Grand Master Tan has two children who have followed him into the fengshui business. His son Mark Tan Junyuan had little interest in fengshui before attending UC Berkeley, where he graduated with a degree in Political Science in 2008. Studying abroad made him aware of how little he knew about Chinese culture, and he chose to reject a position as a management trainee at a bank in favour of following in his father's footsteps and pursuing a career as a fengshui master. His daughter Tan Xueting has a degree in business management from the Singapore Institute of Management (SIM)-Royal Melbourne Institute of Technology (RMIT) joint partnership programme, and since graduating from that program in 2007, has worked as a sales manager in her father's business.

Publications
Grand Master Tan has written or co-authored books related to fengshui, destiny studies, Chinese culture and traditions. Some of his publications include: 
Fengshui: A Guide for Exterior Fengshui (Way Media, 1999)
The Secrets of the Five Dragons (Times Books International, 2001)
Hottest Fengshui Tips for Your Home (Way OnNet Group, 2003)
Hottest Destiny Tips for Your Life (Way OnNet Group, 2004)
Hidden Dragons in an Urban City: Singapore Feng Shui Insights (Way OnNet Group, 2014)

References

Living people
Singaporean people of Chinese descent
Singaporean people of Teochew descent
Recipients of the Pingat Bakti Masyarakat
Year of birth missing (living people)